Phoenix is a former coal mining community between Nordegg and Rocky Mountain House in west-central Alberta, Canada.

A sawmill operated along the North Saskatchewan River near Phoenix in the 1920s to produce railway ties for the Burrows Lumber Company.

References

Clearwater County, Alberta
Ghost towns in Alberta